The Great Torc from Snettisham or Snettisham Great Torc is a large Iron Age torc or neck ring in electrum, from the 1st century BC. It is one of the finest pieces of early Celtic art in a distinctly British Celtic style. It is the most spectacular object in the Snettisham Hoard of torcs and other metalwork found in 1950 near the village of Snettisham in Norfolk, East Anglia.  The perfectly intact torc is outstanding for its high level of craftsmanship and superb artistry. Soon after its discovery it was acquired by the British Museum.

Discovery
The torc was accidentally found in 1950 by a farmer ploughing a field at Ken Hill near the village of Snettisham. It had been buried with a bracelet and coin, which helped to date the torc to around 75 BC. Many other Iron Age hoards have since been found in the vicinity, but the Great Torc is considered by archaeologists to be the most important find from Snettisham. Declared part of a treasure trove soon after its discovery, the torc was purchased by the British Museum with the support of the National Art Collections Fund.

Description
The torc was made in two ways: 64 complex threads of metal were grouped into ropes and twisted around each other to create the crescent shaped necklace; the ends of the torc were cast in moulds with La Tène designs and welded onto the metal ropes to create the whole composition. Given the large amount of precious metals found at the site, in addition to the sophisticated design of luxurious jewellery such as this, it has been conjectured that the area around Snettisham may have been connected with royalty from the Iceni tribe, that was based in this part of England at the time.

See also
Lochar Moss Torc
Sedgeford Torc
Newark Torc

References

Bibliography

Torcs
Ancient Celtic metalwork
Prehistoric objects in the British Museum
Gold objects
Individual items of jewellery